The National Fastpitch Coaches Association Hall of Fame was established in 1991 to recognize coaches who have made extraordinary contributions to the sport of softpitch softball. The National Fastpitch Coaches Association ("NFCA") is a professional organization for fastpitch softball coaches from all competitive levels of play. As of 2022, 91 individuals have been inducted into the NFCA Hall of Fame.

Inductees

See also
National Softball Hall of Fame and Museum

References

Softball in the United States
Softball museums and halls of fame
Coaching awards
Awards established in 1991
1991 establishments in Kentucky
Halls of fame in Kentucky
Museums in Louisville, Kentucky
Softball in Kentucky